The forests of contemporary Israel are mainly the result of a massive afforestation campaign by the Jewish National Fund (JNF). This article is a list of these forests.

In the 19th century and up to World War I, the Ottoman Empire cleared the land of Israel of its natural reserves of pine and oak trees, in order to build railways across the empire. Since it was founded the JNF has planted in Israel more than 185 million trees creating 280 forests, and still operates today.

Jerusalem District

 Aminadav Forest – Judean hills near Aminadav
 Canada Forest – Jerusalem corridor
 Eshtaol Forest - near Beit Shemesh
 Gilo Forest – (Gilo neighborhood)
 Jerusalem Forest – (between Givat Shaul neighborhood and Ein Karem)
 Martyrs Forest – (above Moshav Ksalon (Shimshon-Sha'ar HaGai Junction)
 Peace Forest – (below East Talpiot promenade)
 Ramot Forest – (between Ramot neighborhood and Shu'afat)

Central District

 Ben Shemen Forest – (east of Ben Shemen youth village)
 Hulda Forest – (Nahshon Junction – Rehovot road) Planned in 1907 by the Jewish National Fund, which brought in a German agronomist, Louis Barish, to manage the project. Restored in 1998.
 Meginim Forest - Gezer region
 Tzora Forest – (between Shimshon and Nahshon Junctions) near Tzora
 Rosh HaAyin Forest

Northern District
 Carmel Coast Forest – (Fureidis-Haifa Road)
 Hadera Forest – (near railway station)
 Irron Forest – (Hadera-Megiddo Road)
 Mt. Hurshan – (near Amikam)
 Mt. Shehumit (Har Nahash) - (Kiryat Shmona)
 Atatürk Forest - Mount Carmel

Galilee
 Ahihud Forest – (Acre-Safed Road near Mt. Gamal)
 Biriya Forest – (Safed-Biriya Road)
 Lower Hanita Forest – (Shlomi-Hanita Road)
 Parod Forest – (Acre-Safed Road, near Kibbutz Parod)

Upper Galilee
 Baram Forest – (Shlomi-Sasa Road, near Meron Junction)
 Lavi Forest – (Golani Interchange)
 Mt. Turan – (near Golani Interchange-Mitzpe Netofa)
 Segev Forest

Lower Galilee
Beit Keshet Forest
Swiss Forest
Tiberias Forest

Southern District
 Amatzia woodlands – (near Amatzia)
 Melachim Forest, Shachariya – (between Kiryat Gat and Lakhish Junction)

Negev
 Be'eri Forest – (on Road No. 232 near Be'eri from Hodiya Junction (Road No. 232) off Zikim-Karmia Road)
 Lahav Forest  – (northern Negev)
 Yatir Forest  – (northeast Negev)

Jewish mythology 
 Dvei Ilai

See also

 National parks and nature reserves of Israel

References

External links
KKL-JNF Forest Recreation Sites

 
Forests
Israel
Protected areas of Israel
Desert greening